The 1966 Colorado Buffaloes football team was an American football team that represented the University of Colorado as a member of the Big Eight Conference during the 1966 NCAA University Division football season. Led by fourth-year head coach Eddie Crowder, the Buffaloes compiled an overall record of 7–3 with a mark of 5–2 in conference play, runner-up in the Big 8. Colorado played their home games on campus at Folsom Field in Boulder, Colorado.

The starting safeties were Dick Anderson and Hale Irwin, both from Boulder High School. Irwin was first-team all-conference, Anderson was honorable mention.

Schedule

References

External links
 University of Colorado Athletics – 1966 football roster
 Sports-Reference – 1966 Colorado Buffaloes

Colorado
Colorado Buffaloes football seasons
Colorado Buffaloes football